Le Chant des Girondins (English: The Song of the Girondists) was the national anthem of the French Second Republic, written for the drama Le Chevalier de Maison-Rouge by the writer Alexandre Dumas with Auguste Maquet. The lines of the refrain were borrowed from "Roland à Roncevaux", a song written in Strasbourg by Claude-Joseph Rouget de Lisle, the author of La Marseillaise. The music is by conductor-composer Alphonse Varney.

Lyrics

References

External sources
 Music Sheet (Page 1) 
 Music Sheet (Page 2) 

French Second Republic
Historical national anthems
French anthems